Lamarck's honey bee or the Egyptian honey bee, Apis mellifera lamarckii, is a subspecies of honey bee 
occurring in a narrow range along the Egyptian Nile Valley of Egypt and Sudan, named after Jean-Baptiste Lamarck and is considered the first honey bee domesticated, before 2600BC.

Description
It is a dark honey bee with yellow abdomen, and is a small subspecies like the subspecies south of the Sahara.  The Lamarck's mitotype can also be identified in honey bees from California and in feral bees from Florida.

A trait of the A. m. lamarckii is that it does not collect propolis nor does it form winter clusters and therefore may not overwinter well in areas that experience freezing temperatures or prolonged winters.

It is considered aggressive, with a low honey yield.

See also
Subspecies of Apis mellifera

References

 

mellifera lamarckii
Western honey bee breeds
Insects of Africa
Insects of Egypt
Insects of Sudan
Insects described in 1906